Twin Rivers is a civil parish in the East Riding of Yorkshire, England. It is situated 

The civil parish is formed by the villages of Adlingfleet and Whitgift and the hamlet of Ousefleet.

The parish was part of the Goole Rural District in the West Riding of Yorkshire from 1894 to 1974, then in Boothferry district of Humberside until 1996.

According to the 2011 UK census, Twin Rivers parish had a population of 367, an increase on the 2001 UK census figure of 357.

References

External links

Civil parishes in the East Riding of Yorkshire